The Modern Jazz Quartet & Orchestra is an album by American jazz group the Modern Jazz Quartet featuring performances recorded in West Germany in 1960 with an Orchestra and released on the Atlantic label.

Reception
The Allmusic review stated "this is a successful effort worth listening to several times".

Track listing
All compositions by John Lewis except as indicated
 "Around the Blues" (Andre Hodeir) - 8:25 
 "Divertimento" (Werner Heider) - 8:17 
 "England's Carol" - 6:20 
 "Concertino for Jazz Quartet and Orchestra: First Movement" (Gunther Schuller) - 6:42 
 "Concertino for Jazz Quartet and Orchestra: Second Movement - Passacaglia" (Schuller) - 6:38 
 "Concertino for Jazz Quartet and Orchestra: Third Movement" (Schuller) - 5:54

Personnel
Milt Jackson - vibraphone
John Lewis - piano
Percy Heath - bass
Connie Kay - drums 
Unnamed orchestra conducted by Werner Heider and Gunther Schuller

References

Atlantic Records albums
Modern Jazz Quartet albums
1960 albums
Albums produced by Nesuhi Ertegun